Vetulicola is a genus of extinct marine animals discovered from the Cambrian of China. It is the eponymous member of the enigmatic phylum Vetulicolia, which is of uncertain affinities but may belong to the deuterostomes. The name was derived from Vetulicola cuneata, the first species described by Xian-guang Hou in 1987 from the Lower Cambrian Chiungchussu Formation in Chengjiang, China.

Description
The type species, Vetulicola cuneata, as originally described by Xian-guang Hou in 1987, has a body plan similar to those of arthropods and composed of two distinct parts of approximately equal length. The anterior part is rectangular with a carapace-like structure of four rigid cuticular plates, with a large mouth at the front end. The posterior section is slender, strongly cuticularised and placed dorsally. Paired openings connecting the pharynx to the outside run down the sides. These features are interpreted as possible primitive gill slits. Vetulicola cuneata could be up to 9 cm long. The Vetulicola are thought to have been swimmers that were possible filter feeders.

Other Vetulicola species described are Vetulicola rectangulata (Luo and Hu, 1999), V. gantoucunensis (Luo et al., 2005), V. monile (Aldridge et al., 2007), and V. longbaoshanensis (Yang et al., 2010).  The mouth openings of all the other species are smaller, and do not protrude as in V. cuneata.  All other species, with the stark exception of V. gantoucunensis, are smaller than the type species.

Taxonomy
Vetulicolas taxonomic position is controversial. V. cuneata was originally assigned to the phylum Arthropoda on the assumption that it was a bivalved arthropod like Canadaspis and Waptia, but the lack of legs, the presence of gill slits, and the four plates in the "carapace" were unlike any known arthropod. In 2001, Degan Shu and his team reinterpreted the animals as deuterostomes placing Vetulicola in the new family Vetulicolidae, order Vetulicolida, and created a new phylum Vetulicolia. 

Shu later in 2003 argued that the vetulicolians were an early, specialized side-branch of deuterostomes. Patricio Dominguez and Richard Jefferies classify Vetulicola as an urochordate, and probably a stem-group appendicularian. In contrast, Nicholas J. Butterfield places Vetulicola among the arthropods. The discovery of the related Australian vetulicolian Nesonektris, from the Lower Cambrian Emu Bay Shale of Kangaroo Island, and the reidentification of the "coiled gut" of vetulicolians as being a notochord affirms the identification as an urochordate.

EtymologyVetulicola is a compound Latin word composed of vetuli, meaning "old," or "ancient," and cola, meaning "inhabitant."

PaleobiologyVetulicola was the host of the symbiotic organism Vermilituus gregarius, which appears to have lived inside Vetulicolas anterior body. Only around 2% of Vetulicola individuals had Vermilituus infestations, but Vermilituus could be very numerous: one Vetulicola specimen had 88 individuals of Vermilituus infesting it. Such large numbers of symbiotic organisms were probably harmful to the host Vetulicola.

References

External links
Biota of the Maotianshan Shale, Chengjiang China - URL retrieved June 22, 2006
Palaeos' Page on Vetulicolia 
Photos of Vetulicola cuneata fossils - URL retrieved June 22, 2006
Photos of Vetulicola rectangulata fossils - Accessed January 3, 2008
Photos of Vetulicola gangtoucunensis fossils - Accessed January 3, 2008

Vetulicolia
Maotianshan shales fossils
Cambrian genus extinctions